Nazar Kholodnytskyi (Ukrainian: Назар Холодницький; February 1, 1985, Lviv) is a Ukrainian prosecutor, the Deputy Attorney General  —  the head of Specialized Prosecution Service (till August 21, 2020).

Biography 
Nazar Kholodnytskyi was born on January 31, 1985, in Lviv.

He graduated from the Faculty of Law of Ivan Franko National University of Lviv in 2006. Frank with honors, obtaining a master's degree in Law.

At the same time, he began working in the Kyiv Oblast Prosecutor's Office as an assistant, senior assistant, and senior prosecutor of the Kyiv-Sviatoshynskyi District Prosecutor's Office.

Kholodnytskyi held the position of Senior Assistant to the First Deputy Prosecutor General of Ukraine (March — February 2014).

He has a PhD in Law (2015).

References 

1985 births
Living people
Lawyers from Lviv
Ukrainian prosecutors